The National Spherical Torus Experiment (NSTX) is a magnetic fusion device based on the spherical tokamak concept. It was constructed by the Princeton Plasma Physics Laboratory (PPPL) in collaboration with the Oak Ridge National Laboratory, Columbia University, and the University of Washington at Seattle. It entered service in 1999. In 2012 it was shut down as part of an upgrade program and became NSTX-U, for Upgrade.

The spherical tokamak (ST) is an offshoot of the conventional tokamak design. Proponents claim that it has a number of practical advantages over these devices, some of them dramatic. For this reason the ST has seen considerable interest since it was proposed in the late 1980s. However, development remains effectively one generation behind mainline efforts such as JET. Other major experiments in the field include the pioneering START and MAST at Culham in the UK.

NSTX studies the physics principles of spherically shaped plasmas—hot ionized gases in which nuclear fusion will occur under the appropriate conditions of temperature and density, which are produced by confinement in a magnetic field.

History

1999–2012
First plasma was obtained on NSTX on Friday, February 12, 1999 at 7:06 p.m.

Magnetic fusion experiments use plasmas composed of one or more hydrogen isotopes. For example, in 1994, PPPL's Tokamak Fusion Test Reactor (TFTR) produced a world-record 10.7 megawatts of fusion power from a plasma composed of equal parts of deuterium and tritium, a fuel mix likely to be used in commercial fusion power reactors. NSTX was a "proof of principle" experiment and therefore employed deuterium plasmas only. If successful it was to be followed by similar devices, eventually including a demonstration power reactor (e.g. ITER), burning deuterium-tritium fuel.

NSTX produced a spherical plasma with a hole through its center (a "cored apple" profile; see MAST), different from the doughnut-shaped (toroidal) plasmas of conventional tokamaks. The low aspect ratio A (that is, an R/a of 1.31, with the major radius R of 0.85 m and the minor radius a of 0.65 m) experimental NSTX device had several advantages including plasma stability through improved confinement. Design challenges include the toroidal and poloidal field coils, vacuum vessels and plasma-facing components. This plasma configuration can confine a higher pressure plasma than a doughnut tokamak of high aspect ratio for a given, confinement magnetic field strength. Since the amount of fusion power produced is proportional to the square of the plasma pressure, the use of spherically shaped plasmas could allow the development of smaller, more economical and more stable fusion reactors. NSTX's attractiveness may be further enhanced by its ability to trap a high "bootstrap" electric current. This self-driven internal plasma current would reduce the power requirements of externally driven plasma currents required to heat and confine the plasma.

Upgrade 2012–2015

The $94 million NSTX-U (Upgrade) was completed in 2015. It doubles the toroidal field (to 1 Tesla), plasma current (to 2 MA) and heating power. It increases the pulse duration by a factor of five.  To achieve this the central stack (CS) solenoid was widened, and an OH coil, inner poloidal coils, and a 2nd neutral-ion beam line were added.  This upgrade consisted of a copper coil installation, not a superconducting coil.

Poloidal coil problem 2016 and Recovery 2016–2022 
The NSTX-U (Upgrade) was stopped in late 2016 just after its update, due to a failure of one its poloidal coils. This upgrade consisted of a copper coil installation, not a superconducting coil.  The NSTX had been shut down since 2012 and only returned for 10 weeks at the end of 2016 just after it was updated. The origin of this failure is partly attributed to a non-compliance of the chilled copper winding, the manufacture of which had been sub-contracted. After a diagnostic phase requiring the complete dismantling of the reactor and coils, evaluation of the design, and a redesign of major components including the six inner poloidal coils, a restarting plan is adopted in March 2018. Reactivation of the reactor is not planned until the end of 2020. Recent information from PPPL officials predicts NSTX-U is undergoing repairs and is scheduled to be back in operation in 2022.The restart is delayed due to an insulation problem between the central solenoid and the coils around it.

References

Sources 
  – Original source for this article was an earlier version of this page.
 
 Schematic diagram of NSTX-U Facility Upgraded Components

External links
 Overview of The National Spherical Torus Experiment Upgrade from PPPL

Tokamaks
Princeton Plasma Physics Laboratory